Nabeel T. Jabbour (born 1941) is an author, lecturer, and expert on Muslim culture. Jabbour's background includes two perspectives—that of the Arab/Muslim world and of the Western/Christian world. He frequently speaks at churches and teaches at seminaries, interpreting the phenomenon of Islamic Fundamentalism and other Middle Eastern issues to Westerners and especially to Christians.

Academic career 
Jabbour taught high school for two years in Tripoli, Lebanon, then taught Psychology and Cultural Studies (History of Civilizations) for two years at Haigazian University in Beirut. From 1973 to 1975, he worked with university students in Beirut with The Navigators. From 1975 to 1990, he lived and worked in Cairo, Egypt.

Currently, Jabbour teaches courses on "Islam and Current Events" and "Radical Islam and a Christian Response" at:
 Columbia International University - Columbia, South Carolina
 Denver Seminary - Denver, Colorado
 Fuller Theological Seminary - Colorado Springs, Colorado
 Providence College and Theological Seminary - Winnipeg, Manitoba, Canada
 Graduate Institute of Applied Linguistics & College of International Studies - Dallas, Texas

In 2011, the Presbyterian Church in America appointed Jabbour to a study committee on the theology and practices of Insider Movements.

Jabbour also participated in the Windows to the World Conference in Milwaukee, Wisconsin and Chicago, Illinois in April 2015 and the Association of Christian Design Professionals conference in Colorado Springs, Colorado on November 15, 2014

Jabbour serves on the board of directors for Touch of Love International, a nonprofit organization that offers micro-loans and vocational training to impoverished families in developing countries.

Published works 
Books:
 The Crescent Through the Eyes of the Cross (NavPress, 2008)
 Unshackled and Growing: Muslims and Christians on the Journey to Freedom (NavPress, 2006)
 The Unseen Reality (NavMedia of Singapore, 1995)
 The Rumbling Volcano: Islamic Fundamentalism in Egypt (Mandate Press, 1993)
 Itiba' el-Massih, Hal Huwa Ta'geez? (Dar el-Thaqafa of Egypt)
 Al-Kiraza Hubon Wa 'ubour (Dar el-Thaqafa of Egypt)

On February 15, 2008, the date of its release, The Crescent Through the Eyes of the Cross ranked 31st on Amazon.com's Bestsellers list. On the same day, it ranked first in the "Religion and Spirituality/Christianity" and Religion and Spirituality/Islam" categories. In England, it ranked first in Amazon.com's "Middle Eastern Studies" category.

Articles and essays:
 But Can We Trust Mustafa?, Mission Frontiers September–October 2008, 18-19
 Relational Evangelism Among Muslims: Is There a Better Way?, International Journal of Frontier Missions 25:3 (Fall 2008), 151-156
 Islamic Fundamentalism: Implications for Missions, International Journal of Frontier Missions 11:2 (April 1994), 81–86, St. Francis Magazine, Nr. 1 Vol. II (June 2006)
 Islamic Fundamentalism: An Arab Evangelical Offers a Surprising Perspective, The Plain Truth, July–August 1999
 The Unseen Reality: A Panoramic View of Spiritual Warfare, NavPress of Singapore, 1995

Audio recordings:
 10 Reasons Muslims are Eager to Join ISIS, Zwemer Center for Muslim Studies (2016)
 "How ISIS Began in Colorado," podcast on Truth About Muslims/Muslims Christians and the Zombie Apocalypse by Zwemer Center for Muslim Studies, released January 7, 2015
 Understanding Islam (2007)
 The Many Faces of Islam: Library Edition (2004)
 The Many Faces of Islam (America Responds) (2002)

Bibliography
 12 Must-Reads on Mission and Islam by Fuller Professors, Global Reflections Blog, Fuller Theological Seminary, February 23, 2016
 Does Media Mix Islam and Politics?, The Huffington Post, Preetam Kaushik, August 7, 2013
 Interview with David Garrison, "In the House of Islam" DVD, WorldChristian.com, 2014
 Ayman S. Ibrahim, book review in Baptist Theology, Southwestern Baptist Theological Seminary
 Jerrid Stelter, book review on Sixteen:Fifteen
 "101 Books on Missions", BAMEDU.com
 Thomas Freeman, "Insider's View of Muslim Worldview Evanglism", tfreeman.org, August 21, 2013
 Thomas Turner, book review in Everyday Liturgy, January 27, 2011
 Warren Larson, "My Top 5 Books on Islam," Christianity Today, September 2009 
 Colin Chapman, "Premillennial Theology, Christian Zionism, and Christian Mission," International Bulletin of Missionary Research, 33:3 (July 2009), 137
 Sam Townsend, "The Thirsty Rock of the Middle East," Prodigal, January 27, 2009
 Paul Ramseyer, interview for Sounds of Hope 2008 on Vimeo, October 15, 2008 
 Pastor Bob Paulson, interview on BlogTalkRadio, November 12, 2008
 Ted Elm, interview on Northland Notebook with Ted Elm, WWJC, October 7, 2008
 Mark Elfstrand, interview on The Morning Show with Mark Elfstrand, WMBI-FM/Moody Broadcasting Network, August 4, 2008
 Waldron Scott, published under "Review and Preview," Global Missiology, 3:5 (April 2008) 
 Janet Parshall, interview on Talking it Over, Moody Broadcasting Network, April 5, 2008 
 Janet Parshall, interview on Janet Parshall's America, March 4, 2008
 Lorri Allen and Larry Estepa, interview on Mornings, FamilyNet Radio, April 7, 2008
 Neil Stavem, interview on The Way Home, Northwestern Radio Network, April 3, 2008
 Debbie Chavez, interview on The Debbie Chavez Show, May 23, 2008
 "Recommended Books" review, Friends and Neighbors, Reformed Church in America, 2008
 "Recommended Resources," One-to-One Ministry Review, The Navigators, February 20, 2008
 Speaker biography, Faces of Islam Symposium, Northwest University, September 25, 2007
 Ralph D. Winter, book review in International Journal of Frontier Missions, William Carey University, 23:2 (April–June 2006), 86 
 "Learning to Love Muslims," One-to-One Ministry Review, The Navigators, October 12, 2006
 Rich Wilton, "International Insights from Nabeel Jabbour," The Navigators of Canada, November 11, 2005 
 Seminar description, "Reaching Muslim Students on Campus," Urbana (convention), 2003
 Jeremy Craig, article in redandblack.com (University of Georgia), August 29, 2002
 AudioFile (magazine), audio lecture review, August/September 2002 
 Bibliography, The Moral Economy of Islam, Institute of International Studies, University of California, Berkeley, 1998
 Author biography, Oasis Audio
 GodTube video chat with Ed Hoskins, April 3, 2008
 GodTube video introduction to The Crescent through the Eyes of the Cross, February 15, 2008

References

External links 
 Nabeel Jabbour official web site
 Nabeel Jabbour's Biography

1941 births
Living people
American University of Beirut alumni
American people of Lebanese descent
Messiah University
Christian scholars of Islam
Western Seminary
Academic staff of Haigazian University
North Central University